Grand Courage is a Russian heavy/power metal band that was formed in 1999 in Bronnitsy.

History
The band was founded by Mikhail Bugaev in 1999. At that time the band performed only in Bronnitsy. It began to gain fame only in 2004, when the "Golden lineup" was formed.

In 2005 it won the prestigious contest "ProRock" and was a Grand Prix recipient.

On September 20, 2006, the band released its debut album Vechnaya igra, which was well received by fans and critics.

In 2007, the band's name changed from Courage to Grand Courage.

In 2007 and 2008, Grand Courage performed in the famous rock festival Slava Rossii (Fame to Russia). Other bands performing there included Master, Black Obelisk, Arteria, and Mavrin.

In 2008, the band released its second album Novoy nadezhdy svet..., which, according to music journalists, became one of the most prominent Russian heavy metal releases of the year. During the recording of the album, the band invited many famous rock-artists to participate, including Dmitriy Borisenkov, Sergey Sergeev, Alexander Andryukhin and Dmitriy Chetvergov.

On May 9, 2010, the band released its first single, "Na voyne" (Into the War), dedicated to the 65th anniversary of the 1945 victory over Nazi Germany. It is available for free download on their website.

On July 11, 2010, the band performed in the largest Russian rock music festival, Nashestvie. It performed in the alternative scene with bands such as Epidemia, Master, Mavrin, Catharsis, Arda, and Slot.

In the Spring of 2011, Grand Courage began the recording of its third full-length album.

On September 16, 2011, Grand Courage vocalist Mikhail Zhitnyakov was announced on Nashe Radio as the new vocalist for the band Aria. However, Zhitnyakov's departure from Grand Courage was never announced. Interviews with Zhitnyakov repeatedly noted that Grand Courage continued to work on the new album with its Golden lineup.

In February 2012 Zhitnyakov officially left Grand Courage, leaving the band seeking a new frontman. This announcement was made after the band finished recording the new album, and all the vocal parts were recorded with Zhitnyakov. It was noted that Zhitnyakov would remain a Grand Courage member until after the release of the third album, and its presentation concert.

On May 28, 2012, the third album Serdtsa v Atlantide was released. On September 15, the band organized a concert which featured four vocalists: Sergey Sergeev, Alexander Cap, Andrey Nefyodov and Mikhail Nakhimovich. It was not certain if one of these would become the new frontman.

In July 2013, it was announced that the band had found a new frontman, but his identity remained a secret. It was assumed that the band would resume performing at new concerts in the Fall of 2013.

Style and lyrical themes
Grand Courage's style mostly resembles heavy metal with elements of power metal.

Their songs contain themes such as human emotions (love, sorrow, hate, etc.), relationships, mythology, history, war, politics, and patriotism. Mikhail Bugaev, the band's primary songwriter, often draws inspiration from literature and films. For example, the song "Teoriya khaosa" ("Теория Хаоса", "Theory of Chaos") is based on the movie The Butterfly Effect. War as a theme appears in songs like "Te, kogo ryadom net" ("Те, кого рядом нет", "Those Who Are Not Around"), a song dedicated to those who died in the Soviet–Afghan War), and "Na voyne" ("На войне", "At War"), a song in memory of the veterans of World War II.

Band members
Current members
 Evgeni' Kolchin – lead vocals (2013–present)
 Mikhail Bugaev – guitar, keyboards, bandleader, songwriter (1999–present)
 Pavel Selemenev – bass (2001–present)
 Alexey "Zebr" Putilin – drums (2003–present)
 Yuriy Bobyryov – guitar, backing vocals (2012–present)
Former members
 Mikhail Zhitnyakov – lead vocals (2004–2012)
 Evgeniy Komarov – keyboards (1999–2010)
 Sergey Volkov – drums (1999-2003)
 Ravshan "Robson" Muhtarov – bass guitar, lead vocals (1999–2002)
Timeline

Discography
Albums
  ("Вечная игра", "Eternal Game") (2006)
  ("Новой надежды свет", "The Light of New Hope...") (2008)
  ("Сердца в Атлантиде", "Hearts in Atlantis") (2012)
  ("Жить как никто другой", Live Like No One Else) (2016)

Extended plays
 "Eto ne igra" ("Это не игра", It's Not a Game) (2014)

Singles
 "Na voyne" ("На войне", At War) (2010)
 "Lod i plamya" ("Лёд и пламя", "Ice & Fire") (2013)

Compilations
 Demos & Rares (2004-2010) (2017)

References

External links

 
 Grand Courage on Encyclopaedia Metallum
 Courage on Encyclopaedia Metallum
 Гран-Куражъ on Last.fm
 КуражЪ on Last.fm

Musical groups established in 1999
Russian heavy metal musical groups
Russian power metal musical groups
1999 establishments in Russia